Advance Design is a computer-aided engineering (CAE) software application developed by GRAITEC to structural analysis and design of reinforced concrete / steel / timber structures and automated creation of design reports.

Features 
Advance Design offers an environment for the static and dynamic analysis of 2D and 3D reinforced concrete, steel and timber structures using the finite elements method. Advance Design is part of the BIM structural GRAITEC Advance suite.

Release history

See also 
 Comparison of CAD editors for CAE

External links 
Advance Design Official Page

Product lifecycle management
Computer-aided engineering software
Finite element software
Computer-aided design software
GRAITEC products